is a Japanese anime television series produced by Satelight. It is directed and written by Jun'ichi Wada, with character designs by Yūji Iwahara, and music by Tatsuya Kato.  It aired from October to December 2021.

It is an adaptation of the novel Sakugan Labyrinth Marker, written by Nekotarō Inui, which was submitted to Project Anima, a 2018 collaboration between DeNA, Sotsu, and Bunka Housou that accepted story submissions from the general public. Sakugan Labyrinth Marker was the runner-up in the "Science-Fiction/Robot" category.

Characters

Gagumber's nine-year-old daughter. Memempu is incredibly intelligent for her age, having already graduated college with seven doctorates. She often sees visions of a towering structure somewhere on the surface in her dreams and seeks to become a Marker to find this place despite her father's resistance. As such, the two are often at odds with each other, with Memempu seeing Gagumber as a bumbling deadbeat.

Memempu's single father in his thirties, a former Marker turned ore miner once known as "Gale-Force Gagumber" who actively resists Memempu's desire to become a Marker and find a way to the surface, seeing her as too young to attempt such a dangerous journey despite her intelligence. His wife, Memempu's mother, left them some time ago. He owns the Mark Bot "Big Tony," a mining machine that can shift between a humanoid form and a tank-like vehicle form that he and Memempu use to explore the Labyrinth. His implanted chip possesses an illegal function known as "Gale," which allows him to briefly boost his reaction speed to inhuman levels at the cost of potential nerve damage.

 (Japanese); Cristina Vee (English)
A notorious thief wanted throughout the Underground who navigates the Labyrinth on a high-speed all-terrain motorcycle. She encounters Gagumber and Memempu in the Italian-themed Jolly-Jolly colony, saving Gagumber's life in exchange for an exorbitant sum of money he later tells her he doesn't have. As a result, Zackletu claims she will follow the father-daughter pair to the ends of the world until she receives her payment with interest. She is the younger sister of Rufus, Gagumber's late former partner.

 (Japanese); Adam McArthur (English)
A hacker who leads the Yuri Team, a group of orphans from the colony AreYaar who were deemed worthless by the colony's government. After Gagumber helps to expose a corrupt official, Yuri develops a new respect for him and decides to follow Gagumber and Memempu in order to spread his "justice" throughout the Underground. Yuri pilots a customized Bot, painted red, that is equipped with hacking and electronic warfare devices such as an EMP weapon. His hands are mechanical prosthetics.

 (Japanese);Kaiji Tang (English) 
An unflappable agent of the Regulation Bureau tasked with maintaining law and order in the Underground. He also seeks to preserve old knowledge for future generations and has a passion for subjects such as history and nature.

 (Japanese);Erica Mendez (English)
Memempu's friend and "partner," a young Marker who supports and encourages Memempu's dreams and acts much like an older sister. As a Marker, she is officially partnered with her father, Walsh. Tragically, she loses her life when she and her father move out to intercept a kaiju attack, but their death inspires Memempu further to become a Marker. 

Gagumber's former Marker partner who years ago was killed by an unknown entity after Gagumber abandons him. His death sobers Gagumber's reckless attitude and causes him to retire from being a Marker. Zackletu is his younger sister.

He is the leader of a group called Shibito. He wears a mask.

; Sarah Anne Williams (English)
DJ K

A legendary and mysterious Marker recognized as one of the greatest of her kind, having mapped a large portion of the known Underground herself. She sends Memempu a pendant containing a map of the Underground to lead her towards the place in her dreams. She has also been following Gagumber and Memempu's group for unknown reasons.

Media

Anime
The anime was originally scheduled to premiere in 2020, but was delayed to October 2021.  The series aired from October 7 to December 23, 2021, on Tokyo MX, MBS, and BS11.

The opening theme song, "Kо̄kotsu Labyrinth" ("Enchanted Labyrinth"), was performed by Masaaki Endoh, while the ending theme song, "Shine", was performed by MindaRyn. Crunchyroll licensed the series outside of Asia. Bilibili licensed the series in Southeast Asia.

On October 28, 2021, Crunchyroll announced the series will receive an English dub, which premiered on November 18.

Episode list

Manga
A manga adaptation by Keisuke Sato began serialization in Square Enix's Manga UP! website on August 13, 2021.

Notes

References

External links
 

2021 anime television series debuts
Adventure anime and manga
Anime and manga based on novels
Crunchyroll anime
Gangan Comics manga
Japanese webcomics
Mecha anime and manga
Satelight
Shōnen manga